Erythema elevatum diutinum is a form of vasculitis.

It has been described as a paraneoplastic syndrome.

See also 
 Cutaneous small-vessel vasculitis
 List of cutaneous conditions

References

External links 

Vascular-related cutaneous conditions